Octopus Renewables Infrastructure Trust is a large British investment trust dedicated to investment in electricity generation assets in countries including the UK, France and Spain. It floated on the London Stock Exchange in December 2019, raising £350m. FTSE Russell announced have announced that it will join the FTSE 250 Index on 24 November 2022.

The chairman is Phil Austin. Its investment manager is Octopus Renewables Ltd, part of Octopus Group, who replaced Octopus Investments Ltd, also part of Octopus Group, in June 2021. It owns a 15.5% stake in the Lincs Wind Farm.

The company had net assets of £578million as at 31 December 2021.

In June 2022, the company acquired the Cambridgeshire-based Breach Solar Farm and, in August 2022, it acquired a 51% stake in the Crossdykes Onshore Wind Farm.

References

External links
  Official site

Financial services companies established in 2019
Investment trusts of the United Kingdom
Companies listed on the London Stock Exchange